Maxime Sorel is a French professional offshore sailor born on 11 August 1986 in Saint-Malo and now lives in Concarneau France. He finished 10th in the 2020–2021 Vendée Globe.

Results Highlights

General Reference

References

External links
 Vendee Campaign Website

1986 births
Living people
Sportspeople from Saint-Malo
French male sailors (sport)
Class 40 class sailors
IMOCA 60 class sailors
French Vendee Globe sailors
2020 Vendee Globe sailors
Vendée Globe finishers
Single-handed circumnavigating sailors